Hydrelia ornata is a moth in the family Geometridae first described by Frederic Moore in 1868. It is found in Nepal, China and Sikkim, India.

References

Moths described in 1868
Asthenini
Moths of Asia